Mohammed bin Jasim Alghatam (Arabic: محمد بن جاسم الغتم) is a Bahraini politician, engineer and army veteran. He was President of the University of Bahrain and Minister of Education of Bahrain. He was also Chairman of the Board of Directors of Aluminium Bahrain.

Alghatam is the recipient of several awards, including the French Legion of Honour and the Bahrain Crown Prince's Prize for engineering research.

Life and work

Alghatam was born in Muharraq in 1951. He graduated from Nottingham Trent University. He obtained his MSc (based on an analysis of stress, fluid flow and heat transfer) from Loughborough University in the United Kingdom, where he also obtained his PhD in computer-simulated energy. He obtained a Master of Military Art and Science (Politics & Strategies) from the United States Army Command and General Staff College at Fort Leavenworth in 1991.

Alghatam started his career by working for industrial corporations and the Bahrain Defence Force, where he was Director of Logistics Supply.

He became President of the University of Bahrain in 1995 and held that post until 2001. He promoted the creation of the American Studies Center at the university, which was inaugurated in 1998. He was President of the UNESCO National Commission of Bahrain. He was chairman of the board of trustees of the Bahrain Center for Studies and Research (BCSR). He was also a board member of the Economic Development Board and the Founding Chairman of the Board of Directors of the Telecommunications Regulatory Authority tasked with the liberalization of Bahrain's telecoms market. He enhanced research collaboration between the European Union and the Gulf Cooperation Council, and promoted cultural cooperation with China.

As part of a Bahraini government reorganization aimed at consolidating political reforms, Alghatam was appointed Minister of Education in mid-April 2001. He developed national education to reflect the changes in the country.

Alghatam was the chairman of the board of directors of Aluminium Bahrain (Alba), one of the largest aluminium smelters in the world.

Alghatam wrote several books and scholarly articles on development strategies for Bahrain and the Middle East.

Awards and recognition

Alghatam's honours include seven military decorations and medals, His Highness the Crown Prince’s Prize for engineering research, and the State Recognition Prize for distinguished national achievements. France made him a Knight and subsequently a Commander of the Legion of Honour.

He was given an honorary degree of Doctor of Science at Loughborough University in 2002 for his services to education.

Alghatam received the Prime Minister’s Award for Muharraq Pioneers. He is the holder of the Order of Military efficiency, the Order of Bahrain, and the Order of the Liberation of Kuwait, the Kuwait Liberation Medal of the Order of Military Service, and the Order of Shaikh Isa bin Salman al Khalifa. He was also given the State Prize for Outstanding National Work.

Private life

Alghatam is married and has six children.

References

1951 births
Living people
Government ministers of Bahrain
Bahraini writers
Alumni of Nottingham Trent University
Alumni of Loughborough University